This Is Our Science is the fourth solo studio album by American hip hop artist Astronautalis. It was released via Fake Four Inc. on September 13, 2011. It peaked at number 44 on the Billboard Heatseekers Albums chart. Music videos were created for "Contrails", "This Is Our Science", and "Dimitri Mendeleev".

Critical reception

At Metacritic, which assigns a weighted average score out of 100 to reviews from mainstream critics, the album received an average score of 85, based on 7 reviews, indicating "universal acclaim".

Joe Marvilli of Consequence of Sound gave the album a grade of A+, saying: "With all the lines, lyrics, and love he put into This Is Our Science, he'll find a home in every city he visits on the road and a growing fan base of friends with whom he can share his stories."

City Pages included the album on the "Minnesota's Best Albums of 2011" list.

Track listing

Personnel
Credits adapted from liner notes.

 Astronautalis – vocals, production (8)
 Sean Kirkpatrick – synthesizer (1, 2, 5), piano (5)
 McKenzie Smith – drums (1, 2, 5, 7, 9)
 Mike Weibe – vocals (1, 3)
 Picnic Tyme – production (1, 6)
 John Congleton – bass guitar (1, 7), guitar (1, 7, 9), production (11), recording, mixing
 Daniel Hart – strings (1, 7, 9)
 Chad Stockslager – piano (1, 9), vocals (2, 9)
 Isaiah Toothtaker – vocals (2)
 P.O.S – vocals (2)
 Ted Gowan – production (2)
 Sims – vocals (3)
 Lazerbeak – production (3)
 Rickolus – production (4)
 Alias – production (5)
 Tegan Quin – vocals (7)
 Broken – production (7)
 Radical Face – production (9)
 Cecil Otter – production (10)
 Alan Douches – mastering

Charts

References

External links
 
 

2011 albums
Astronautalis albums
Fake Four Inc. albums
Albums produced by Lazerbeak
Albums produced by Alias (musician)
Albums produced by John Congleton